Adrian Davis (born 19 January 1990) is an Indigenous Australian rugby league player. He has previously played for the Newcastle Knights in the NSW Cup and the Redcliffe Dolphins in the Intrust Super Cup.

Background
Born in Kempsey, New South Wales Davis played his junior football with Kempsey Dragons. He attended Granville Boys High before being signed by the Canterbury Bulldogs, where he played for their SG Ball under-20's squads.

He also plays in the annual NSW Koori Knockout and won 2 titles with the Newcastle Yowies.

Playing career

Newcastle Knights
Davis played for Knights Holden Cup team in 2010 and then played for there NSW Cup side between 2011 and 2013. When not selected for the NSW Cup side he played and in the Newcastle competition for Central Newcastle.

Redcliffe Dolphins
Davis played for the Redcliffe Dolphins in the Intrust Super Cup in 2014 season. He also captained the First Nation Goanna's against his previous NSW Cup side for three seasons.

Penrith Panthers
2015 Davis signed a one-year second-tier deal with the Penrith Panthers. He played in their 2015 Auckland Nines team but did not play first grade during the season.

Newcastle Yowies
Without a club for 2016, Davies was selected to tour to United Kingdom with the Newcastle Yowies, an Indigenous invitational team from the Hunter Region. They lost 38–12 to the London Broncos and won against the Wakefield Trinity Wildcats.

Rep honours
 New South Wales Combined High Schools 2008
 NSW Cup Residents 2013
 First Nation Goannas 2014

Career stats

References

1990 births
Australian rugby league players
Indigenous Australian rugby league players
Living people
Newcastle Yowies players
Redcliffe Dolphins players
Rugby league halfbacks
Rugby league players from New South Wales